The 1992 Australian Touring Car Championship was the 33rd running of the Australian Touring Car Championship. It was a CAMS sanctioned motor racing title for drivers of Group 3A Touring Cars, commonly known as Group A cars. It began on 23 February 1992 at Amaroo Park and ended on 21 June at Oran Park Raceway after nine rounds.

Mark Skaife, driving for a Nissan Skyline GT-R for Gibson Motorsport, won his first Australian Touring Car Championship. His teammate and defending series champion Jim Richards finished second, with BMW M3 driver Tony Longhurst finishing in third place.

Even though Mark Skaife was the overall winner of the opening round at Amaroo Park, Peter Brock's win in Heat 1 of the round in his Mobil 1 Racing Holden VN Commodore SS Group A was the first win by a Holden in the ATCC since Brock had won Round 6 of the 1986 ATCC at Surfers Paradise.

In an effort to reduce costs and to even out the cars, CAMS imposed a number of changes for 1992. The Holden Commodore's and Ford Sierra RS500's were restricted to a 7,500 rev limit (a situation that still exists as of 2021) and the BMW M3's, the giant killers of 1991, had an extra 50 kg of weight added to the cars.

However the biggest change came to the Nissan GT-R's. Before the start of the season the cars were given an extra 40 kg, bringing them up to a total of 1400 kg. Gibson Motorsport continually protested against the imposed penalties on the car (after winning the ATCC the cars were given an extra 100 kg to bring them 1500), and even took CAMS to court (unsuccessfully) in a bid to be able to run the GT-R as they were in 1991 claiming that they were no longer competitive. However most saw this as a false claim since the team won both the ATCC and the Tooheys 1000.

Teams and drivers
 
The following drivers competed in the 1992 ATCC.

Results and standings

Race calendar
The 1992 ATCC was contested over a nine rounds series in six different states with two heats per round.

Drivers Championship
Points were awarded on a 30-27-24-21-19-17-15-14-13-12-11-10-9-8-7-6-5-4-3-2 basis to the top twenty drivers at each round. Round positions were determined by applying the same points structure to each of the two heats and ranking the drivers by the total. In the event of two or more drivers having the same total, the round placing was determined by the finishing order in the second heat.

See also
1992 Australian Touring Car season

References

External links
 Official V8 Supercar site Contains historical ATCC information.
 Images from Australian Touring Car racing – 1992 Retrieved from www.autopics.com.au on 17 September 2009

Further reading
 Shell Australian Touring Car Championship (magazine), Special 10th Anniversary Issue, 1996

Australian Touring Car Championship seasons
Touring Cars